Glenolden station is a SEPTA train station on the Wilmington/Newark Line in Pennsylvania. Amtrak does not stop here; it is served only by SEPTA. The line offers southbound service to Wilmington and Newark, Delaware and northbound service to Philadelphia. Located at Glenolden Avenue and Willow Way in Glenolden, the station has a 71-space parking lot.

Station layout
Glenolden has two low-level side platforms with walkways connecting passengers to the inner tracks. Amtrak's Northeast Corridor lines bypass the station via the inner tracks.

References

External links
SEPTA – Glenolden Station
 Glenolden Avenue entrance from Google Maps Street View

SEPTA Regional Rail stations
Stations on the Northeast Corridor
Railway stations in Delaware County, Pennsylvania
Railway stations in the United States opened in 1872
1872 establishments in Pennsylvania
Wilmington/Newark Line